Terence Patrick Segarty (born November 4, 1946) is an Irish-born mechanic, businessman and former political figure in British Columbia. He represented Kootenay in the Legislative Assembly of British Columbia from 1979 to 1986 as a Social Credit member.

He was the son of Robert Segarty and Christine Gilligan and was educated in Ireland. In 1969, he married Hillary Mary Fitzpatrick. Segarty lived in Cranbrook. He was defeated by Anne Edwards when he ran for reelection to the assembly in 1986. He was the only cabinet minister to lose re-election that year. Segarty served in the provincial cabinet as Minister of Labour. He was the president of 2 Baker Developments Ltd, Terrim Property Management Ltd, O'Shea's Entertainment Inc and Birchwood Building Corporation. Segarty was also a director for the Cranbrook Regional Hospital and served on the board for the Royal British Columbia Museum.

References 

1946 births
Living people
British Columbia Social Credit Party MLAs
Irish emigrants to Canada
Mechanics (people)
Members of the Executive Council of British Columbia
Real estate and property developers
20th-century Canadian politicians